This is a list of Bosnian regions by Human Development Index as of 2019,

References 

Bosnia and Herzegovina
Human Development Index
Counties by Human Development Index